The heritage preservation system of South Korea is a multi-level program aiming to preserve and cultivate Korean cultural heritage. The program is administered by the Cultural Heritage Administration (CHA; 대한민국 문화재청, Daehan Minguk Munhwa Jaecheong), and the legal framework is provided by the Cultural Heritage Protection Act of 1962, last updated in 2012. The program started in 1962 and has gradually been extended and upgraded since then.

The CHA classifies cultural heritage into five major categories (state-designated heritage, city and province-designated heritage, cultural heritage material, registered cultural heritage, undesignated cultural heritage) and these are divided further into subcategories. Besides tangible cultural heritage, South Korea aims to preserve its intangible cultural heritage as well, including folk customs, music, dance and handicraft. The program also includes Living National Treasures, persons who possess the knowledge and skills important to pass down intangible cultural heritage to new generations. South Korea has founded several educational centers throughout the country and established a university, specifically dedicated to heritage preservation.

Some of the heritage properties of South Korea has been inscribed into various UNESCO lists. As of 2014, the country has nine cultural and one natural World Heritage Sites, with 15 added to the provisional list; and there are 17 items registered as UNESCO intangible cultural heritage.

Although the program is considered successful by both the public and experts, there are unresolved issues regarding the system and particularly the selection method of "living national treasure" holders.

The Cultural Heritage Administration

The program is administered by the Cultural Heritage Administration (CHA; 대한민국 문화재청, Daehan Minguk Munhwa Jaecheong), the predecessor of which was founded in 1945 by the American military government of Korea. It first belonged to the Ministry of Education, then to the Ministry of Culture. Between 1999 and 2004 it functioned as an independent agency. The CHA administers the National Palace Museum of Korea as well as various 'palace offices' and 'shrine offices'. It is also responsible for the Royal Tombs of the Joseon Dynasty, which are part of the UNESCO World Heritage.

The CHA established Korea National University of Cultural Heritage in 2000, which specifically educates professionals for heritage preservation. Since 1999 the South Korean government founded 27 educational centers for cultivating intangible cultural heritage. The administrator of CHA is Kim Hyeon-mo since 2020. The annual budget of the administration was 615 billion won in 2012.

The legal framework for the heritage program is provided by the Cultural Heritage Protection Act of 1962 (문화재보호법, Munhwajae Bohobeop), last updated in 2012.

History

The legal framework of cultural heritage preservation is based on the number 961 Law of 1962 (문화재보호법 Munhwajae Bohobeop), which in turn is based on the similar Japanese act of 1950. The Korean act is broader in scope, also extending to folklore. The act was amended in 1970 not only to include people (인간문화재, ingan munhwajae, "human cultural heritage") but also to support them financially.

At the beginning of the program, after the Korean War, the CHA had little means to operate. Go Sangnyeol (고상렬), the administrator of CHA between 1961 and 1968 set out to search for intangible cultural properties on the basis of a series of articles written by Yae Yonghae (예용해) for Hankook Ilbo, as the reporter spent years in exploring the country and interviewing old masters of handicraft. The first items to be inscribed on the intangible heritage list were thus taken from Yae's articles. Others were added based on the opinions of researchers and also included winners of the annual folk tradition competitions. The recommendation of local administrations was also sought.

Korea introduced a unique system in the 1970s to preserve folk traditions (including handicraft, arts, folk songs, folk dances, theatre, traditional food preparation techniques, etc.). This was triggered by a movement called New Community, aiming to modernize life in the countryside. In an attempt to get rid of old superstitions, the movement advocated cutting down the old Zelkova trees often found at village entrances, as they were believed to be 'protectors' of the village according to tradition. In 1971, the songs of the haenyo, or "sea women" of Jeju Island were declared provincial intangible cultural properties.

Major stakeholders of the intangible heritage program are "living national treasures" or officially called "holders" (보유자 boyuja), people who possess knowledge or skills essential for preserving Korean culture. Some of these 'holders' obtained significant national exposure or fame, for example Han Bongnyeo (한복려), a holder for the Korean royal court cuisine who supervises the authentic presentation of Joseon Dynasty food in historical movies and television series.

The UNESCO Convention for the Safeguarding of the Intangible Cultural Heritage took place in 2003 and South Korea joined the program a year later. In 2005 China declared some 1200 properties as intangible cultural heritage, with 16 items belonging to the Korean minority of the country, including the traditional wedding ceremony, Arirang (a folk song) and nolttwigi (a traditional seesaw game). The CHA decided that they also had to broaden the scope of intangible heritage to properties that do not have any designated 'holders', like kimchi, hangul or Goryeo ginseng.

The CHA opened its World Intangible Heritage Complex in Jeonju, which also functions as a national centre.

In 2017, the CHA decided to widen the range of possible cultural assets, including objects younger than 50 years. Thus items like Yuna Kim's skates she wore at the 2010 Winter Olympics and the first train operated by the Seoul Metropolitan Subway in 1974 are also designated as cultural assets.

Classification
As of July 2013 South Korea has 411 active National Treasures, 2317 Treasures, 485 Historic Sites, 104 Scenic Sites. It also classified 459 Natural Monuments, 134 Intangible Cultural Heritage items, 1062 Folklore Cultural Heritage properties and 549 Cultural Heritage of Early Modern Times. In 2012 there were 180 active Living National Treasures, out of 570 registered, the rest mainly retired.

State-designated heritage

Province- or city-designated heritage

Other classification

Cultural heritage material
Cultural heritage rendered important from a regional point of view but not classified by cities or provinces.

Registered cultural heritage
Early modern buildings built between the end of the 19th century and the 1940s, in need of preservation due to their condition.

Unregistered cultural heritage
Classified into two categories:
 General Movable Cultural Heritage, Article 76, Cultural Heritage Protection Act: ancient books, documents, wood blocks, sculptures, paintings, handicraft, archaeological findings that have not been classified by the state or a city/province but in need of protection for their historical and artistic values and the export of which are forbidden.
 Buried Cultural Heritage, Article 43, Cultural Heritage Protection Act: properties buried under ground or in the sea.

UNESCO heritage
Relations with UNESCO are coordinated through the Korean National Commission for UNESCO since 1954.

World Heritage

South Korea joined the UNESCO World Heritage program on 14 June 1950. There are nine cultural and one natural world heritage sites in South Korea as of 2013, with 15 additional items on the provisional list. World heritage sites include the Pulguksa temple complex and the Changdeokgung palace, and the provisional list includes sites like the ancient mountain fortresses in Central Korea.

Intangible cultural heritage
As of 2020, there are 21 South Korean items inscribed as UNESCO intangible cultural heritage:

Memory of the World

As of 2017 there are 16 South Korean items inscribed into the Memory of the World Register:

Criticism
The cultural heritage program of South Korea is generally considered a success both by academics and the public, however, a few issues remain to be addressed. One of them is the selection process of the "holders", as the prestige and state support of the position creates high competition between folk artists to be selected. According to Choi Sung-ja, a member of the Intangible Cultural Heritage Subcommittee, the intangible cultural heritage program should not be tied exclusively to the existence of "holders", and a less subjective selection process should be introduced. Since 2009 the CHA changed its selection process by involving academic professionals to introduce a more objective evaluation system of "holders".

Changes in society also brought challenges to the program. For example, in the 1990s Christian groups started to question the need to classify shamanistic rituals as cultural heritage. Patriarchal lifestyle, where the man is the main provider of the family and women stay at home, also influenced "holders", as housewives started to pick up the preservation of folk traditions also in areas that were previously dominated by men. The government resisted appointing female holders for such predominantly male traditions but was gradually forced to acknowledge them when there were no male practitioners at all, or where the women were significantly more talented than the men.

According to Roald Maliangkay of The Australian National University, the program faces challenges from the Korean Wave, as well. As Korean culture is becoming more popular worldwide, due to the influence of television series and K-pop, South Korea started to use its culture as a means of soft power, involving its cultural heritage, too. Maliangkay thinks that

See also
Philippine Registry of Cultural Property
National Commission for Culture and the Arts
National Museum of the Philippines
National Library of the Philippines

References

External links

 Official Website of the Cultural Heritage Administration 
 Korean National Commission for UNESCO 

 
Cultural heritage
Korean traditions